Triangulus is a genus of parasitic barnacles in the family Triangulidae, the sole genus of the family. There are at least four described species in Triangulus.

Species
These species belong to the genus Triangulus:
 Triangulus bilobatus (Boschma, 1925)
 Triangulus cornutus (Boschma, 1935)
 Triangulus munidae Smith, 1906
 Triangulus papilio (Kossmann, 1872)

References

Barnacles